Margyricarpus pinnatus, commonly known as pearl-fruit, is an ornamental plant in the family Rosaceae, which is native to South America.

References

 

Sanguisorbinae
Flora of South America